The Old Beth Israel Synagogue is a historic religious building at 307 Townes Street in the Stone Avenue neighborhood of Greenville, South Carolina. It is a single-story Classical Revival brick building with stone trim. This first Orthodox Jewish synagogue in Greenville was designed by Joseph Cunningham, a local architect, and built in 1929-30 for a congregation founded in 1910. The congregation moved to a larger space in 1957.

Grace Evangelical Methodist Church moved into the building in 1959, and its name remains above the entrance arch. In 1964, the building became the home of the Greenville Labor Temple Cooperative; and in 1977, Faith Tabernacle Apostolic Church bought the building and held its first service there in May 1978. A photo studio bought the building in 1988 and sold it in 2004. Although the building was originally located in a residential area, commercial development and urban renewal isolated it, and it was abandoned in 2010. In 2015 the building was restored and repurposed as a private residence for a married couple, the entrepreneurs Melinda Lehman and Terry Iwaskiw. No evidence of the building's use as a synagogue remains except for a small brick-and-tile Star of David on either side of the parapet.

The building was listed on the National Register of Historic Places in 2016.

See also
National Register of Historic Places listings in Greenville, South Carolina

References

Synagogues on the National Register of Historic Places in South Carolina
Neoclassical architecture in South Carolina
Synagogues completed in 1929
Synagogues in South Carolina
National Register of Historic Places in Greenville, South Carolina
Buildings and structures in Greenville County, South Carolina
Orthodox synagogues in the United States